The main article is about the computer game series Railroad Tycoon.

Other uses:
 Railroad Tycoon (video game)
 Railroad Tycoon (board game)

See also:
Business magnate, for people referred to as "railroad tycoon"